Pelitropis rotulata is a species of tropiduchid planthopper in the family Tropiduchidae. It is found in the Caribbean Sea and North America.

References

Further reading

External links

 

Tropiduchidae
Articles created by Qbugbot
Insects described in 1908